100% Hits: The Best of 2005 is a 2-disc compilation album released by EMI Music Australia and Warner Music Australia. The album was the #14 compilation album on the year-end charts in Australia for the year 2005 (see 2005 in music). It has also been certified platinum in Australia for selling over 70,000 units.

Track listing

Disc 1
 Gorillaz featuring De La Soul – "Feel Good Inc." (3:43)
 Crazy Frog – "Axel F" (2:51)
 Rob Thomas – "Lonely No More" (3:46)
 Missy Higgins – "The Special Two" (4:24)
 James Blunt – "You're Beautiful" (3:21)
 Daniel Powter – "Bad Day" (3:52)
 Coldplay – "Speed of Sound" (4:49)
 Kylie Minogue – "I Believe in You" (3:19)
 Moustache featuring Melinda Jackson – "Everywhere" (3:22)
 Midnight Star – "Midas Touch" (Starskee Radio Edit) (3:29)
 Tina Cousins – "Wonderful Life" (3:50)
 Paris Avenue featuring Robin One – "I Want You" (3:26)
 Live Element – "Something About You" (3:18)
 Simple Plan – "Welcome to My Life" (3:24)
 Thirsty Merc – "Someday, Someday" (3:40)
 Joel Turner and The Modern Day Poets – "These Kids" (3:59)
 P-Money featuring Scribe – "Stop the Music" (3:14)
 Max Graham vs. Yes – "Owner of a Lonely Heart" (2:40)
 Inaya Day – "Nasty Girl" (Ivan Gough Radio Edit) (3:13)
 Eric Prydz – "Call on Me" (2:47)
 Uniting Nations – "Out of Touch" (Love You So Much Radio Mix) (3:30)
 Cabin Crew – "Star2Fall" (2:47)

Disc 2
 The Wrights – "Evie (Part 1)" (3:56)
 Ben Lee – "Catch My Disease" (4:14)
 Stereophonics – "Dakota" (4:57)
 Evermore – "It's Too Late" (3:57)
 Kasey Chambers – "Pony" (4:04)
 Jimmy Barnes with Dallas Crane – "Sit on My Knee" (2:44)
 Joss Stone – "You Had Me" (3:36)
 End of Fashion – "O Yeah" (3:00)
 Kisschasy – "Do-Do's & Whoa-Oh's" (3:30)
 Caesars – "Jerk It Out" (3:17)
 The Cat Empire – "Sly" (3:46)
 Fast Crew – "I Got" (3:54)
 Audio Bullys featuring Nancy Sinatra – "Shot You Down" (2:56)
 Junior Jack – "Stupidisco" (3:39)
 Dancing DJs vs. Roxette – "Fading Like a Flower" (3:03)
 Armand Van Helden – "Into Your Eyes" (2:50)
 A-Studio featuring Polina – "S.O.S" (3:01)
 Tom Novy featuring Michael Marshall – "Your Body" (3:31)
 The Chemical Brothers – "Galvanize" (4:28)
 Moby – "Lift Me Up" (3:07)
 Goldfrapp – "Ooh La La" (2:58)
 Mylo – "In My Arms" (3:46)

References

External links
 100% Hits: The Best of 2005 on Amazon

2005 compilation albums
EMI Records compilation albums